Roberdel Mill No. 1 Company Store is a historic company store located at Roberdel, Richmond County, North Carolina, north of Rockingham.  It was built about 1885, and is a one-story, three bay, brick building with a gable roof.  The Roberdel Mill administrative offices were housed in the Manufacturers Building.

It was listed on the National Register of Historic Places in 1983.

References

Commercial buildings on the National Register of Historic Places in North Carolina
Commercial buildings completed in 1885
Buildings and structures in Randolph County, North Carolina
National Register of Historic Places in Richmond County, North Carolina
Company stores in the United States